Vangani is a town in Maharashtra, India near the city of Mumbai. It is serviced by the Vangani railway station on the Central Line of the Mumbai Suburban Railway on the Mumbai-Karjat route and the MH SH 43 Highway which connects it with the Suburban Mumbai.

Vangani is basically divided into two parts viz. Vangani Gaon which lies on the East side of Vangani Rly. Station and the Market area is on the West. On its east side, near to station. Then waterfall called 'Bhagirath' to the east of the railway station during the monsoons. There is pandav kalin Shankar Temple in Kadav pada. Then in vangani gaon, in jungle area, there is a Goddess WAGHESHWARI DEVI and God Tiger (Waghoba) temple, in it the god Tiger (Waghoba) does not have its head to its body having a history behind it and this Temple is surrounded with greenery.

Vangani is known for plant nursery and masala (powdered spices).

The newly built B R Harne college of Engineering, Karav, over an area of about 14 hectares near Vangani, has given an ambiance of development in the area which is otherwise a lonely town. Students of this college have also conducted various programs which had good response from the people of Vangani. There will be a road connectivity through the tunnel which will directly get linked up to the airport which is being constructed in Navi Mumbai (Ulwa) which will increase the demand of Vangani.

Khagol Mandal, an association of amateur astronomers, conducts public sky observation sessions from Vangani on Saturdays.

Due to an upsurge in the population in nearby Badlapur and Ambernath, people are moving towards Vangani for better living, as the climate is fresher and less polluted as compared to rest of the grown cities in this belt. The move is primarily for monetary purposes as more and more people move close to Mumbai, the prices of property goes higher. Many schools conduct camp in this place.
There are many constructions going on in this area. There are also many huge townships coming up in this area.
Cities and towns in Thane district
It is a greenery town. It seems to be a very good idea for investment now as the property prices in this area are going to rise high because of the airport coming up in Navi Mumbai.It is the last town of the thane district, after that Shelu belongs to the Raigad district.